Randjespark is a suburb of Johannesburg, South Africa. It is located in Region 2.

Johannesburg Region A